Ahmadvand (also Romanized as Aḩmadvand) is a village in Mirbag-e Shomali Rural District, in the Central District of Delfan County, Lorestan Province, Iran. At the 2006 census, its population was 103, in 20 families.

References 

Towns and villages in Delfan County